Wilfredo García (born 29 October 1977) is a Cuban wrestler. He competed in the men's freestyle 54 kg at the 2000 Summer Olympics.

References

External links
 

1977 births
Living people
Cuban male sport wrestlers
Olympic wrestlers of Cuba
Wrestlers at the 2000 Summer Olympics
Place of birth missing (living people)
Pan American Games medalists in wrestling
Pan American Games gold medalists for Cuba
Wrestlers at the 1999 Pan American Games
Medalists at the 1999 Pan American Games
20th-century Cuban people
21st-century Cuban people